Propylbenzene may refer to:

 n-Propylbenzene, the straight chain isomer (IUPAC name propylbenzene)
 Cumene (isopropylbenzene)